Kim Hyun-woo (Korean: 김현우; born 7 March 1999 in South Korea) is a South Korean footballer who plays as a defender for Daejeon Hana Citizen in K League 1 and the South Korea U23 national team.

Career
In 2018, Kim signed for GNK Dinamo Zagreb, Croatia's most successful club with fellow South Korean Kim Gyu-hyeong.

On 29 September 2020, he joined 1. HNL side NK Istra 1961 on loan.

On 12 February 2021, he joined NK Slaven Belupo until the end of the season.

Ahead of the 2022 K League 1 season, Kim joined Ulsan Hyundai on loan. His only appearance came on 24 April 2022, where he played the full 90 minutes in a 5-0 victory over Guangzhou F.C. in the 2022 AFC Champions League.

After four years in Croatia, Kim joined K League 1 side Daejeon Hana Citizen on a permanent deal on 5 January 2023.

Career statistics

Club
.

Notes

References

External links
 Kim Hyun-woo at Soccerway

South Korean footballers
South Korean expatriate footballers
Living people
Association football defenders
1999 births
GNK Dinamo Zagreb players
GNK Dinamo Zagreb II players
NK Istra 1961 players
NK Slaven Belupo players
South Korean expatriate sportspeople in Croatia
Expatriate footballers in Croatia
South Korea under-20 international footballers